Alice M. Moore Batchelder (born August 15, 1944) is an American attorney and jurist. She is currently a senior United States circuit judge of the United States Court of Appeals for the Sixth Circuit. She served as chief judge from 2009 until 2014. She also was considered by President George W. Bush as a potential nominee for a United States Supreme Court seat that ultimately went to Justice Samuel Alito. Her husband William G. Batchelder was a former state Court of Appeals judge and a state legislator, who had served more than 30 years in the Ohio House of Representatives and served as Speaker of the House from 2011 until 2014.

Education and early career
Batchelder was born Alice Moore in Wilmington, Delaware. She graduated from Ohio Wesleyan University in 1964, where she met her future husband, William G. Batchelder. Batchelder received her Juris Doctor degree from the University of Akron School of Law in 1971, and her Master of Laws (LL.M.) degree from the University of Virginia School of Law in 1988. Batchelder briefly taught English and had a private legal practice from 1971 to 1983 in Medina, Ohio, near Cleveland.

Federal judicial service

Bankruptcy court service 
In 1983, Batchelder was appointed a Judge of the United States bankruptcy court for the Northern District of Ohio. Her service as a bankruptcy judge ended on April 4, 1985 when she was elevated to district judge.

District court service 
On February 28, 1985, President Ronald Reagan nominated Batchelder to a seat, created by 98 Stat. 333, on the United States District Court for the Northern District of Ohio. She was confirmed by the United States Senate on April 3, 1985. She received her commission on April 4, 1985. Batchelder's service on the district court position was officially terminated on January 4, 1992, due to her elevation to the Sixth Circuit Court.

Court of appeals service 
On June 12, 1991, President George H. W. Bush nominated Batchelder to the United States Court of Appeals for the Sixth Circuit to the seat vacated by Pierce Lively. She was confirmed by the Senate on November 27, 1991. She received her commission on December 2, 1991. On August 14, 2009, she became Chief Judge of the Sixth Circuit. She stepped down as chief judge on August 15, 2014, upon turning 70. On September 19, 2017, she announced that she intended to assume senior status upon confirmation of a successor. She assumed senior status on March 7, 2019 when her successor, Eric E. Murphy, was confirmed by the United States Senate.

See also
 George W. Bush Supreme Court candidates

References

External links
 
 

|-

|-

1944 births
20th-century American judges
Judges of the United States bankruptcy courts
Judges of the United States Court of Appeals for the Sixth Circuit
Judges of the United States District Court for the Northern District of Ohio
Living people
Ohio lawyers
Ohio Wesleyan University alumni
People from Wilmington, Delaware
United States court of appeals judges appointed by George H. W. Bush
United States district court judges appointed by Ronald Reagan
University of Akron alumni
University of Virginia School of Law alumni
20th-century American women judges